Abraham G. Gerges (born March 20, 1934) is an American politician who served in the New York City Council from the 29th district from 1975 to 1990.

References

1934 births
Living people
Politicians from Brooklyn
New York City Council members
New York (state) Democrats